Zonitis vittigera, the brown blister beetle, is a species of blister beetle in the family Meloidae. It is found in North America.

Subspecies
These two subspecies belong to the species Zonitis vittigera:
 Zonitis vittigera propinqua MacSwain, 1951
 Zonitis vittigera vittigera (LeConte, 1853)

References

Further reading

 

Meloidae
Articles created by Qbugbot
Beetles described in 1853